Bill Wisdom (April 11, 1932January 21, 2004) was an American politician who served in the Kansas state legislature from 1975 to 1996.

Wisdom was born and grew up in Oklahoma. He moved to Kansas as a young man to attend Kansas City Kansas Community College, and subsequently worked as a supervisor for General Motors.

Wisdom was originally elected to the Kansas House of Representatives in 1975. He served for 9 terms as a Democrat, leaving the House in 1992; in that year, he was elected to the Kansas State Senate succeeding John Steineger, where he served a single term before being replaced by John's son Chris Steineger.

References

1932 births
2004 deaths
Democratic Party Kansas state senators
Democratic Party members of the Kansas House of Representatives
Politicians from Kansas City, Kansas
20th-century American politicians